Cyclone is an unincorporated community in Wyoming County, West Virginia, United States, along Huff Creek and West Virginia Route 10.

The community was named for the fact a tornado or cyclone struck the area in the 1880s.

References

Unincorporated communities in West Virginia
Unincorporated communities in Wyoming County, West Virginia